Stibiconite is an antimony oxide mineral with formula: Sb3O6(OH). Its name originates from Greek "stibi" (antimony) and "konis" (powder), alluding to its composition and habit. It is a member of the pyrochlore super group.

Discovery and occurrence
It was first described in 1862 for an occurrence in the Brandholz - Goldkronach District, Fichtelgebirge, Franconia, Bavaria. 

It occurs as a secondary alteration product of other hydrothermal antimony minerals such as stibnite. It occurs in association with cervantite, valentinite, kermesite, native antimony and stibnite.

References

Antimony minerals
Oxide minerals
Cubic minerals
Minerals in space group 227